Sheffield Central is a constituency represented in the House of Commons of the UK Parliament since 2010 by Paul Blomfield, a member of the Labour Party.

Boundaries 
First creation
1885–1918: The Municipal Borough of Sheffield wards of St Peter's and St Philip's, and part of St George's ward.

1918–1950: The County Borough of Sheffield wards of St Peter's and St Philip's, and part of Broomhall ward.

1950-1983: See other seats.

Second creation (current)

1983–1997: The City of Sheffield wards of Burngreave, Castle, Manor, Netherthorpe, and Sharrow.

1997–2010: as above plus Nether Edge

Sheffield City Council was subject to new ward boundaries from 2004, which removed Castle, Manor, Netherthorpe and Sharrow, whilst adding Central and Manor Castle wards.

2010–2015: The City of Sheffield wards of Broomhill, Central, Manor Castle, Nether Edge, and Walkley.

2015–present: The City of Sheffield wards of Broomhill & Sharrow Vale, City, Manor Castle, Nether Edge & Sharrow, and Walkley; and parts of the wards of Crookes & Crosspool, Ecclesall, Fulwood and Hillsborough.

Present boundaries
The seat covers central Sheffield and extends as far as Nether Edge and the Manor.  It covers a similar area to the former Sheffield Park seat.  It borders Sheffield Hallam, Sheffield Heeley, Sheffield Brightside and Hillsborough and Sheffield South East.

History

1885–1950
Created under the Redistribution of Seats Act 1885 for the election that year, Sheffield Central was one of five divisions of the former Sheffield constituency.  Sheffield Central was abolished in 1950 and the sitting MP, Harry Morris, stood and won in the new seat (now extinct) of Sheffield Neepsend.

1983–present
Revival
In varied form the constituency was brought back into existence for the 1983 general election.

MPs
Labour's Richard Caborn represented Sheffield Central from its recreation in 1983 until he retired in 2010 and was narrowly succeeded at the ballot box by another Labour MP, Paul Blomfield.

Winning margin
The 2015 result made the seat the 32nd-safest of Labour's 232 seats by percentage of majority.

Labour majorities since 1983 in Sheffield Central have been in the top quartile save for 2010 — the Liberal Democrat share of the vote came 0.4% short of winning the seat — a highly marginal result.

Opposition parties
The Green Party took second place in 2015, gaining a +12.1% swing (compared with +2.8% nationwide).  This was the main target seat of the party in Yorkshire. Its 2012-2016 Leader Natalie Bennett, chose to settle locally on stepping down from the policy-steering role in 2016 and had chosen to contest Sheffield Central at the 2017 general election. Lib Dem candidates scored variable second places in 1997, 2001, 2005 and 2010 then took fourth place in 2015.

Turnout
Turnout has ranged from 62.5% in 1987 to 49.5% in 2001.

Future
Blomfield has announced that he will stand down at the next general election.  The Labour Party has selected Sheffield city councillor Abtisam Mohamed to fight the seat, beating Eddie Izzard in the selection contest.

Constituency profile 
The constituency has  a working population whose income is close to the national average and lower than average reliance upon social housing. At the end of 2012 the unemployment rate in the constituency stood as 4.0% of the population claiming jobseekers allowance, see table.

There is a large student population and in 2015, the constituency had the youngest median age of voters at 26 years, compared to 39 years for the UK.

The district contributing to the bulk of the seat has a medium 33% of its population without a car. A medium 24.3% of the city's population are without qualifications, a high 15.8% of the population with level 3 qualifications and a medium 25.7% with level 4 qualifications or above.  In terms of tenure a relatively low 58.3% of homes are owned outright or on a mortgage by occupants as at the 2011 census across the district.

Members of Parliament

Elections

Elections in the 2010s

Elections in the 2000s

Elections in the 1990s

Elections in the 1980s

Elections in the 1940s

Elections in the 1930s

Elections in the 1920s

Elections in the 1910s

Bailey was sponsored by the National Amalgamated Union of Labour

Elections in the 1900s

Elections in the 1890s

Elections in the 1880s

See also 
 List of parliamentary constituencies in South Yorkshire

Notes

References

Central
Constituencies of the Parliament of the United Kingdom established in 1885
Constituencies of the Parliament of the United Kingdom disestablished in 1950
Constituencies of the Parliament of the United Kingdom established in 1983